Baculifera is a genus of lichens in the family Caliciaceae. It was circumscribed in 2000 by Bernhard Marbach and Klaus Kalb. Species in this genus are characterized by having bacilliform conidia typically measuring 8–11 μm long, and a non-inspersed hymenium. The genus is roughly similar in morphology to Buellia.

Species
Baculifera cinereocincta 
Baculifera curtisii 
Baculifera entochlora 
Baculifera epifuscescens 
Baculifera epiviolascens 
Baculifera imshaugiana 
Baculifera intermedia 
Baculifera intermedioides 
Baculifera longispora 
Baculifera macromera 
Baculifera metaphragmia 
Baculifera metaphragmioides 
Baculifera micromera 
Baculifera orosa 
Baculifera pseudomicromera 
Baculifera remensa 
Baculifera tobleri 
Baculifera xylophila

References

Caliciales
Lichen genera
Caliciales genera
Taxa described in 2000
Taxa named by Klaus Kalb